Twifo-Atti Morkwa is a constituency represented in the Parliament of Ghana. It elects one Member of Parliament (MP) by the first past the post system of election. The Twifo/Atti-Morkwa constituency is located in the Twifo/Atti-Morkwa District of the Central Region of Ghana.

Boundaries 
The seat is bounded on the north by the Upper Denkyira East Municipality on the south by the Hemang Lower Denkyira District, on the west by the Mpohor Wassa East District, and on the east by the Assin North Municipality and Assin South District of the Central Region of Ghana.

Members of Parliament

Elections

See also
List of Ghana Parliament constituencies

References 

Parliamentary constituencies in the Central Region (Ghana)